The 2014–15 Colorado Avalanche season was the 20th operational season and 19th playing season since the franchise relocated from Quebec prior to the start of the 1995–96 NHL season. As well as the franchise's 36th season in the National Hockey League and 43rd season overall.

The Avalanche missed the playoffs despite qualifying the previous season.

Off-season
On May 26, 2014, goaltender Jean-Sebastien Giguere announced his intention to retire, reportedly saying, "I do not see a reason to remain in the League."

Standings

Suspensions/fines

Schedule and results

Pre-season

Regular season

Player statistics
Final 
Skaters

Goaltenders

†Denotes player spent time with another team before joining the Avalanche. Stats reflect time with the Avalanche only.
‡Traded mid-season
Bold/italics denotes franchise record

Notable achievements

Milestones

Transactions
The following transactions took place during the 2014–15 NHL season.

Trades

Free agents acquired

Free agents lost

Claimed via waivers

Lost via waivers

Lost via retirement

Player signings

Draft picks

The 2014 NHL Entry Draft will be held on June 27–28, 2014, at the Wells Fargo Center in Philadelphia.

Draft notes
Colorado's second-round pick went to the Calgary Flames as the result of a trade on March 5, 2014, that sent Reto Berra to Colorado in exchange for this pick.
Edmonton's fourth-round pick (previously acquired by the Toronto Maple Leafs) went to Colorado as the result of a trade on April 3, 2013, that sent Ryan O'Byrne to Toronto in exchange for this pick.

References

Colorado Avalanche seasons
Colorado
Colorado
Colorado Avalanche
Colorado Avalanche